Crazy Mazey is a 1982 maze video game published by Datamost.

Gameplay
Crazy Mazey is a game in which the player collects money in a series of mazes, avoiding killer cars that try to crash into the player's car.

Reception
Daniel Hockman reviewed the game for Computer Gaming World, and stated that "If you like Head On you will find Crazy Mazey even more enjoyable."

References

External links
Review in Creative Computing Video & Arcade Games
Review in Creative Computing
Review in Electronic Games
1984 Software Encyclopedia from Electronic Games
Review in Softalk

1982 video games
Apple II games
Apple II-only games
Datamost games
Maze games
Video games developed in the United States